Table tennis was contested at the 1978 Asian Games in Bangkok, Thailand.

Table tennis had team, doubles and singles events for men and women, as well as a mixed doubles competition.

Medalists

Medal table

References

 ITTF Database

External links
OCA official website

 
1978 Asian Games events
1978
Asian Games
1978 Asian Games